SQ8 may refer to:
 SQ8 Snapper, a Reaktor sequencer
 Korg SQ-8, a hardware music sequencer